Tobadzischini ("Child of Water"/"Born For Water") is a mythical hero from Navajo mythology who helped his brother Nayenezgani rid the world of the Anaye. He is sometimes considered the Navajo god of war and agriculture. Nayenezgani appears to be a lord of light, while Tobadzischini, moist and dark, is his opposite, a lord of darkness.

References 

Deities of the indigenous peoples of North America
Navajo mythology
Heroes in mythology and legend